Dalip is a given name. Notable people with the name include:

Dalip Kaur Tiwana, novelist and short-story writer of contemporary Punjabi literature
Dalip Singh (athlete) (born 1899), Indian track and field athlete
Dalip Singh Rana, (born 1972), Indian actor and professional wrestler, known as The Great Khali
Dalip Singh Saund (1899–1973), member of the United States House of Representatives
Dalip Singh Sukerchakia (Maharaja Dalip Singh) GCSI (1838–1893), the last Maharaja of Sikh Raj
Dalip Tahil (born 1952), Indian film, television and theatre actor